Cascade merge sort is similar to the polyphase merge sort but uses a simpler distribution.  The merge is slower than a polyphase merge when there are fewer than six files, but faster when there are more than six.

References

External links
 http://www.minkhollow.ca/Courses/461/Notes/Cosequential/Cascade.html

Sorting algorithms
Comparison sorts
Stable sorts